The Ports-to-Plains Alliance, based in Lubbock, Texas, United States, is a non-profit, bipartisan, advocacy group led by mayors, council persons and other local elected leaders, economic development officials, business and other opinion leaders from nine states (Texas, New Mexico, Oklahoma, Colorado, North Dakota, South Dakota, Montana, Nebraska and Wyoming) and one Canadian province (Alberta) which contains a 2,300-plus mile economic development corridor stretching from Texas to Alberta.

The alliance was formalized in 2009 through an agreement between groups representing three congressionally designated High Priority Corridors on the U.S. National Highway System (NHS): the Ports-to-Plains Trade Corridor Coalition; Heartland Expressway; and the Theodore Roosevelt Expressway Association. Today, as the Ports-to-Plains Alliance, the coalition works together to assure continued prosperity in communities throughout North America’s energy and agricultural heartland.

Aims 
The alliance promotes trade, investment, infrastructure development and intermodal connectivity in the Ports-to-Plains region. Originally, each individual group lobbied the U.S. Congress, the White House and state governments for highway improvement dollars, with largely local goals in mind.

Today, the Ports-to-Plains Alliance is a forum for collaboration, and a partnership for maximizing the potential of the region and its people. The alliance raises funds to sustain and improve the Ports-to-Plains regional intermodal transportation network.

Core services 
Through its volunteer Board, full-time professional staff headquartered in Lubbock, Texas, and advocacy professionals in all nine states, Canada, Mexico and Washington, D.C., the alliance provides its member communities, partners and businesses the following core services:
  Advocacy: The alliance monitors legislative developments in all nine states likely to impact the region’s energy and agriculture sectors, and the infrastructure they require to flourish. Member communities rely on Alliance leaders and staff to help them identify, pursue and capture hard dollars for local highway projects.
  Economic Development: The alliance provides communities a forum for marketing local business, investment and tourism to a national and international business audience.
  Industry Partnerships: Through industry work groups, the alliance provides the energy, agriculture, transportation, trucking and other industries a means of providing guidance on policy matters, educating the public, and promoting their brands.

References

External links 
 Ports-to-Plains Alliance website
 Heartland Expressway
 Theodore Roosevelt Expressway
 CANAMEX Corridor
 Map of intermodal connections across Ports-to-Plains economic region

Organizations based in Texas